Chris "The Westside Strangler" Brennan (born October 12, 1971) is an American mixed martial artist who last competed in the Welterweight division. A professional competitor from 1996 until 2012, he competed for the UFC, PRIDE, Cage Rage, King of the Cage and Shooto. He is a former King of the Cage Middleweight Champion and former King of the Cage Middleweight Superfight Champion. He is also one of 18 fighters to compete in the -77 kg division at the ADCC Submission Wrestling World Championships in 2005.  Chris was  also the founder of Nogi Industries, a Mixed martial arts clothing company.  In 2014 Chris was inducted in to the Mixed Martial Arts Hall of Fame. Chris is the owner and founder of Next Generation MMA.  After retiring from MMA competition Chris switched his focus back to grappling events and also entered and won the No-Gi Black Belt World Championships in 2013, 2014, and 2015. He was also the 2014 Nogi Pan American Champion.

Background
Brennan was born in Compton, California but soon moved to Orange County before settling in Laguna Hills and Huntington Beach, California where he spent the next 10 years. Growing up, Brennan claims that he lived in at least 19 different homes and played baseball and soccer but was ultimately more interested in individual sports such as bodybuilding, surfing, gymnastics, and motocross. While working as a bouncer, Brennan saw UFC 1 and was motivated by the dominant performance of UFC Hall of Famer Royce Gracie. Brennan soon began training with Gracie himself and received his Brazilian jiu-jitsu black belt in only seven years. Brennan later became the first no-gi Brazilian jiu-jitsu instructor in the United States.

Mixed martial arts career

Early career
Brennan made his professional mixed martial arts debut in 1996 and compiled a record of 4–1–1 before being signed by the UFC.

UFC
Brennan made his UFC debut against Courtney Turner at the UFC 16 Lightweight Tournament on March 13, 1998 and won via armbar submission in the first round. In his next fight later that night, Brennan lost to future five-time champion, Pat Miletich via submission.

King of the Cage
Brennan made his King of the Cage debut against future King of the Cage Lightweight Champion Joe Stevenson and won via submission. In his next fight, Brennan fought against future MFC Lightweight Champion Antonio McKee for the King of the Cage Middleweight Superfight Championship and won via knockout with a head kick. In his first title defense, Brennan was defeated by Joe Hurley after he was knocked out from elbows.

On August 4, 2001 Brennan defeated Kevin Hogan via armbar submission to become the new King of the Cage Middleweight Champion and then in his next fight, successfully defended his title against Steve Berger. After a one-fight stint with the UFC at UFC 35, a loss to Gil Castillo, Brennan won two more fights outside of King of the Cage before returning to defend his title again, this time against John Alessio. Brennan was defeated via TKO.

PRIDE
Brennan went 0–2 in Shooto, losing a controversial decision to Takanori Gomi before he made his PRIDE debut on October 5, 2003 at Bushido 1 against Eiji Mitsuoka and won via kimura submission in the first round. In his next appearance for the organization, he faced Daiju Takase a year later at Bushido 2 and lost via unanimous decision.

His last fight in PRIDE was at Bushido 12 against Tatsuya Kawajiri, and he was defeated via TKO only 29 seconds into the first round.

Post-PRIDE
Since his last fight in PRIDE, Brennan has gone 2–2, competing for Cage Rage and King of the Cage.

Personal life
Brennan has sons, Lucas (born 2000), who is also a professional mixed martial artist currently competing in Bellator MMA, and Tyler who currently wrestles at the University of Arkansas

Championships and accomplishments
King of the Cage
KOTC Middleweight Championship (One time; first)
Two Successful Defenses
KOTC Middleweight Superfight Championship (One time; first)
One Successful Defense
Ultimate Fighting Championship
UFC 16 Lightweight Tournament Runner Up
As a professional MMA fighter his 21 wins were: 18 first round submissions, 1 second round submission, 1 second round KO, and 1 three round unanimous decision, a 95% finish rate, amongst the highest in MMA.

 2013 IBJJF Black-Belt No-Gi World Champion
 2014 IBJJF Black-Belt No-Gi World Champion
 2015 IBJJF Black-Belt No-Gi World Champion
 2014 Pan-Am No-Gi Champion
 Between 2013 and 2015 in 20 grappling matches only four total points scored against

Mixed martial arts record

|-
| Win
| align=center| 21–14–1
| Brandon Gaines
| Submission (kimura)
| KOTC: Aerial Assault
| 
| align=center| 1
| align=center| 1:31
| Thackerville, Oklahoma, United States
|
|-
| Win
| align=center| 20–14–1
| Marvin Babe
| Submission (armbar)
| KOTC: Bad Intentions 2
| 
| align=center| 1
| align=center| 0:33
| Thackerville, Oklahoma, United States
|Return to Middleweight.
|-
| Loss
| align=center| 19–14–1
| Quinn Mulhern
| Submission (omoplata)
| KOTC: Militia
| 
| align=center| 1
| align=center| 2:01
| Highland, California, United States
| 
|-
| Loss
| align=center| 19–13–1
| Jean Silva
| KO (punches)
| Cage Rage 23
| 
| align=center| 2
| align=center| 2:26
| London, England
| 
|-
| Win
| align=center| 19–12–1
| Adam DiSabato
| Submission (toe hold)
| GFC: Evolution
| 
| align=center| 1
| align=center| 2:11
| Columbus, Ohio, United States
| 
|-
| Loss
| align=center| 18–12–1
| Tatsuya Kawajiri
| TKO (strikes)
| PRIDE Bushido 12
| 
| align=center| 1
| align=center| 0:29
| Nagoya, Japan
|Lightweight (73 kg) bout.
|-
| Loss
| align=center| 18–11–1
| Vítor Ribeiro
| Submission (swollen eye)
| GFC: Team Gracie vs Team Hammer House
| 
| align=center| 2
| align=center| 3:25
| Columbus, Ohio, United States
| 
|-
| Win
| align=center| 18–10–1
| Shannon Ritch
| Submission (guillotine choke)
| RM 7: Championship Night
| 
| align=center| 1
| align=center| 1:19
| Tijuana, Mexico
| 
|-
| Win
| align=center| 17–10–1
| Mark Moreno
| Submission (armbar)
| Extreme Wars - X-1
| 
| align=center| 1
| align=center| 1:14
| Honolulu, Hawaii, United States
| 
|-
| Loss
| align=center| 16–10–1
| Daiju Takase
| Decision (unanimous)
| PRIDE Bushido 2
| 
| align=center| 2
| align=center| 5:00
| Yokohama, Japan
|Middleweight bout.
|-
| Win
| align=center| 16–9–1
| Eiji Mitsuoka
| Submission (kimura)
| PRIDE Bushido 1
| 
| align=center| 1
| align=center| 4:31
| Saitama, Japan
|Heavyweight bout.
|-
| Win
| align=center| 15–9–1
| Jason St. Louis
| Submission (armbar)
| Adrenaline Fighting Championships 1
| 
| align=center| 1
| align=center| 4:20
| Langley, British Columbia, Canada
| 
|-
| Loss
| align=center| 14–9–1
| Rob Emerson
| Submission (achilles lock)
| Hitman Fighting 3
| 
| align=center| N/A
| align=center| N/A
| Santa Ana, California, United States
| 
|-
| Loss
| align=center| 14–8–1
| Takaharu Murahama
| Submission (achilles lock)
| Shooto: 1/24 in Korakuen Hall
| 
| align=center| 1
| align=center| 2:49
| Tokyo, Japan
| 
|-
| Loss
| align=center| 14–7–1
| Takanori Gomi
| Decision (unanimous)
| Shooto: Treasure Hunt 10
| 
| align=center| 3
| align=center| 5:00
| Yokohama, Japan
| 
|-
| Win
| align=center| 14–6–1
| Shannon Ritch
| Submission (armbar)
| Aztec Challenge 1
| 
| align=center| 1
| align=center| 4:50
| Juárez, Mexico
| 
|-
| Loss
| align=center| 13–6–1
| John Alessio
| TKO (punches)
| KOTC 15: Bad Intentions
| 
| align=center| 1
| align=center| 2:20
| San Jacinto, California, United States
| Lost King of the Cage Middleweight Championship.
|-
| Win
| align=center| 13–5–1
| Thomas Denny
| Submission (armbar)
| Gladiator Challenge 11
| 
| align=center| 1
| align=center| 3:12
| San Jacinto, California, United States
| 
|-
| Win
| align=center| 12–5–1
| John Chrisostomo
| Submission (keylock)
| Warriors Quest 4: Genesis
| 
| align=center| 1
| align=center| 4:10
| Honolulu, Hawaii, United States
| 
|-
| Loss
| align=center| 11–5–1
| Gil Castillo
| Decision (unanimous)
| UFC 35
| 
| align=center| 3
| align=center| 5:00
| Uncasville, Connecticut, United States
| 
|-
| Win
| align=center| 11–4–1
| Steve Berger
| Decision (unanimous)
| KOTC 11: Domination
| 
| align=center| 3
| align=center| 5:00
| San Jacinto, California, United States
| Defended King of the Cage Middleweight Championship.
|-
| Win
| align=center| 10–4–1
| Kevin Hogan
| Submission (armbar)
| KOTC 10: Critical Mass
| 
| align=center| 2
| align=center| 1:08
| San Jacinto, California, United States
| Won King of the Cage Middleweight Championship.
|-
| Win
| align=center| 9–4–1
| Robert Wynne
| Submission (armbar)
| Reality Submission Fighting 1
| 
| align=center| 1
| align=center| 1:05
| Belleville, Illinois, United States
| 
|-
| Loss
| align=center| 8–4–1
| Joe Hurley
| KO (elbows)
| KOTC 5: Cage Wars
| 
| align=center| 1
| align=center| 4:30
| San Jacinto, California, United States
| Lost King of the Cage Middleweight Superfight Championship.
|-
| Win
| align=center| 8–3–1
| Antonio McKee
| KO (head kick)
| KOTC 3: Knockout Nightmare
| 
| align=center| 2
| align=center| 0:09
| San Jacinto, California, United States
| Won King of the Cage Middleweight Superfight Championship.
|-
| Win
| align=center| 7–3–1
| Joe Stevenson
| Submission (triangle choke)
| KOTC 1: Bas Rutten's King of the Cage
| 
| align=center| 1
| align=center| 2:04
| San Jacinto, California, United States
| 
|-
| Loss
| align=center| 6–3–1
| Steve Gomm
| Submission (knees)
| Bas Rutten Invitational 3
| 
| align=center| 1
| align=center| 2:27
| Denver, Colorado, United States
| 
|-
| Win
| align=center| 6–2–1
| Steve Horton
| Submission (guillotine choke)
| Extreme Challenge 22
| 
| align=center| 1
| align=center| 2:13
| West Valley City, Utah, United States
| 
|-
| Loss
| align=center| 5–2–1
| Pat Miletich
| Submission (shoulder choke)
| rowspan=2| UFC 16
| rowspan=2| 
| align=center| 1
| align=center| 9:02
| rowspan=2| New Orleans, Louisiana, United States
| UFC 16 Welterweight Tournament Finals.
|-
| Win
| align=center| 5–1–1
| Courtney Turner
| Submission (armbar)
| align=center| 1
| align=center| 1:20
| UFC 16 Welterweight Tournament Reserve Bout.
|-
| Loss
| align=center| 4–1–1
| Pat Miletich
| Decision (unanimous)
| Extreme Challenge Trials
| 
| align=center| 1
| align=center| 30:00
| Davenport, Iowa, United States
| 
|-
| Draw
| align=center| 4–0–1
| Pat Miletich
| Draw
| Extreme Challenge 9
| 
| align=center| 1
| align=center| 20:00
| Davenport, Iowa, United States
| 
|-
| Win
| align=center| 4–0
| Delcio Delcio
| Submission (guillotine choke)
| Carioca de Freestyle
| 
| align=center| 1
| align=center| 4:46
| Brazil
| 
|-
| Win
| align=center| 3–0
| Steve Oliver
| Submission (rear-naked choke)
| rowspan=2| Independent Event
| rowspan=2| 
| align=center| 1
| align=center| 1:52
| rowspan=2| Mississippi, United States
| 
|-
| Win
| align=center| 2–0
| Randal Kemp
| Submission (armbar)
| align=center| 1
| align=center| 1:35
| 
|-
| Win
| align=center| 1–0
| Scott Carter
| Submission (Peruvian necktie)
| Independent Event
| 
| align=center| 1
| align=center| 2:12
| California, United States
|

References

External links
 
 

American male mixed martial artists
Mixed martial artists from California
Lightweight mixed martial artists
Mixed martial artists utilizing Brazilian jiu-jitsu
Living people
1971 births
American practitioners of Brazilian jiu-jitsu
People awarded a black belt in Brazilian jiu-jitsu
Ultimate Fighting Championship male fighters